Hugh James Delargy (26 September 1908 – 4 May 1976) was a Labour Party politician and MP.

He was born in Prestwich, Lancashire, of Irish parents.

Delargy was educated in England, Paris and Rome and worked as a teacher, journalist, labourer and insurance official. He was a Manchester City Councillor from 1937 to 1946.

Delargy was Member of Parliament for Manchester Platting from 1945 to 1950, and for Thurrock from 1950 until his death in 1976. He was a Labour whip from 1950 to 1952. His successor at the subsequent by-election was Oonagh McDonald.

He was a member of the Anti-Partition of Ireland League, secretary of the Friends of Ireland, and participated in the Manchester Martyrs commemoration in Manchester in 1949 which was addressed by Éamon de Valera.

He was a holder of the Grand Cross of the Polonia Restituta awarded by the Polish government-in-exile.

Involvement in the John Bodkin Adams Affair

Delargy played an interesting but minor part in the aftermath of the John Bodkin Adams trial. Adams, a doctor, was suspected of being a serial killer but was controversially found not guilty in 1957. On 8 November 1956 however, the Attorney-General Reginald Manningham-Buller who was to prosecute the case, handed a confidential Scotland Yard report into Adams' activities to Dr McRae, Secretary of the British Medical Association (BMA), effectively the doctors' trade union in Britain. The prosecution's most valuable document was then copied and passed to Adams' defence counsel.

After a tip-off from a Daily Mail journalist, on 28 November Delargy (in conjunction with MP Stephen Swingler) addressed a question to the Attorney-General to be answered in the House of Commons on 3 December regarding Manningham-Buller's contacts with the General Medical Council and BMA within the last six months. Manningham-Buller was absent on the day in question but gave a written reply stating he had "had no communications with the General Medical Council within the last six months." He avoided referring to the BMA directly and therefore avoided lying, though it could be argued, deliberately misled the House.

Adams was eventually acquitted of the murder of Edith Alice Morrell but was suspected by Home Office pathologist Francis Camps of killing 163 patients.

Notes

References 
Times Guide to the House of Commons October 1974

External links 

1908 births
1976 deaths
Labour Party (UK) MPs for English constituencies
Councillors in Manchester
Recipients of the Order of Polonia Restituta
People from County Antrim
People from Prestwich
Politics of Thurrock
UK MPs 1945–1950
UK MPs 1950–1951
UK MPs 1951–1955
UK MPs 1955–1959
UK MPs 1959–1964
UK MPs 1964–1966
UK MPs 1966–1970
UK MPs 1970–1974
UK MPs 1974
UK MPs 1974–1979